Living Apart Together is a 1982 romantic comedy television film directed by Charles Gormley in his film debut and starring musician BA Robertson, Barbara Kellerman and Judi Trott. The films also features Peter Capaldi in his film debut. The film was commissioned by Channel Four Films, who sponsored it. It was released in cinemas on 29 November 1982 and was screened on Channel Four in June 1983. The film underwent extensive restoration, funded by Creative Scotland, Park Circus and Film4, after being lost for many years and was released on DVD on 4 March 2013.

Plot 
Scottish rock star Ritchie Hannah returns to Glasgow for the funeral of a friend. Tired of the upheaval of their marriage, his wife Evie takes this opportunity to walk out on him and their two children. With the help of his manager's assistant, Alicia, Ritchie tries to search for her, but fails to. The next day, a bad-tempered Ritchie admits during a radio interview that his wife has left him and then storms off to the pub. He calls his friend Steve, who tells him Evie is at the Warehouse Club and that she is with another man. Ritchie uses Steve's car as a spare set of keys are kept behind the bar, but two men get in with him with the intention of beating him up. In trying to escape, he crashes the car and then instead of finding Evie at the club, he finds Alicia who has drunk too much. They then spend the night at Steve's flat. Alicia finds out that Evie is living with her new partner, Joe and drives Ritchie there, where he confronts Evie and they argue.

Cast 

 BA Robertson as Ritchie Hannah
 Barbara Kellerman as Evie Hannah
 Judi Trott as Alicia
 Dave Anderson as Steve McNally
 Jimmy Logan as Jake
 Anne Kristen as Ritchie's mother
 David Bain as Ritchie's band
 Gilly Gilchrist as Ritchie's band
 John McGlynn as Ritchie's band
 Kenny Potter as Ritchie's band
 Stevie Lange as Ritchie's singers
 Sylvia Mason-James as Ritchie's singers
 Ben Walls as Ben Hannah
 James Cosmo as Priest
 Amy Walls as Amy Hannah
 Kathy Brawley as Pub singer
 George McGowan Bank as Pub hand
 Peter Capaldi as Joe
 Douglas Sannachan as Piano shop assistant
 Hilton Midleton as Piano shop manager
 Doreen Cameron as Woman at shop
 Terry Neason as Woman at shop
 John Gordon-Sinclair as Zak's barman
 Sam Brown as Sam
 Jeff Jackson as Robbie
 Tiger Tim Stevens as Radio Clyde reporter

Retrospective reviews 
Eddie Harrison for magazine The List gave the film 4/5 stars and wrote that the film "has gained from being lost for several decades; the reliance on natural locations now make it seem like a time capsule of local delights, from gaudy Woolworths signs to forgotten Glasgow nightspots like DeQuincey’s, and Robertson’s vertically loading gramophone is a sight to behold", but that "Gormley’s film feels decidedly modern in the way it deftly probes away at Ritchie’s West of Scotland machismo, revealing an inner darkness behind his well-crafted tunes".

Anthony Nield for The Digital Fix wrote that "Gormley can be, at times, a little too low-key for his own good. He handles the musical moments well and similarly finds just the right tone for the more comedic touches (the lightness of Anderson’s performance plays its part here too), but the dramatic edges don’t quite hit home as well they should. To an extent I wonder whether Robertson’s lack of experience as an actor had its say in such matters – it’s clear early on (during a scene in which he and Kellerman are required to row) that he’s much less comfortable with the ‘big’ moments, yet gives off a natural charm when less is required" and that the film "doesn’t quite grab the viewer as well it should". Keir Roper-Caldbeck for The Skinny gave the film 3/5 stars and wrote that "Charles Gormley's light-footed approach to character and dialogue quickly beguiles" and that "the bouffant BA Robertson proves an amiable leading man".

In an interview with Harrison for The List in 2013, Robertson said he was "quite disbelieving about the whole Scottish film business" and that "we had a very tight budget, we were shooting on Super 16 so we had tonnes of technical problems. It seemed like an absolute racing certainty that Charlie and I would come to blows at some point, but we didn’t." He also said "‘a lot of the crew were quite suspicious of me, and rightly so. I didn’t have a scooby what I was doing!".

References

External links 

Channel 4 television films
British romantic comedy films
1980s English-language films
1980s British films
British comedy television films